Broadway is a major street in Chicago's Lake View, Uptown, and Edgewater community areas on the city's North Side, running from Diversey Parkway (2800 North) to Devon Avenue (6400 North). Originally called Evanston Avenue, the name of the street was changed to Broadway on August 15, 1913, as part of 467 road name changes enacted on that date. The new name was taken from New York City's famous theater district. 

The street runs at a mostly southeast-to-northwest diagonal direction between Diversey Parkway and Lawrence Avenue (4800 North).  Between Lawrence Avenue and Devon Avenue, Broadway runs in a north-to-south direction and becomes 1200 West in place of Racine Avenue.  The north–south section of Broadway is located a half-block west of and parallel to the Chicago Transit Authority's Red Line and Purple Line elevated train tracks. Broadway carries U.S. Route 14 from its terminus at Foster Avenue to the intersection of Ridge and Bryn Mawr Avenues. Broadway is the only street in the city of Chicago that does not have a suffix. It is not a Street, Avenue, Road, Boulevard nor Parkway; it is known simply as Broadway.

Major intersections

References

Streets in Chicago
U.S. Route 14
Transportation in Cook County, Illinois